Lyman Henry Andrews (April 2, 1938 – February 13, 2009) was an American poet, critic and close friend of Allen Ginsberg and Robert Lowell, amongst other writers with whom he maintained a lifelong contact. Based since the early 1960s in the United Kingdom, he was acquainted with William S. Burroughs in both Tangiers and London.

Life
Andrews was born on April 2, 1938 in Denver, which he later portrayed in The Times as "the sort of city many Americans would like their home-town to be", although he also regarded it as having a mediocre cultural life. He studied English at Brandeis University – where he was taught by Philip Rahv, Claude Vigée and Pierre Emmanuel – and graduated with a BA in 1960. He then embarked on postgraduate work at the University of California, Berkeley, where he received a Fulbright grant to conduct research overseas at King's College London.

In 1964 Andrews took up a post as Assistant Lecturer in English at the University College of Swansea (now Swansea University). The following year he became a Lecturer in American Studies at the University of Leicester, remaining in situ (and leading a somewhat "colourful" life) until he took early retirement in 1988. During that time he wrote several reviews and articles for leading publications, and from 1969 to 1978 he was a poetry critic for The Sunday Times. 

Andrews also occasionally intervened in political matters, signing a declaration in 1967 urging Harold Wilson's Labour Government to withdraw its support for United States policy in Vietnam. That same year, he was a defence witness for John Calder and Marion Boyars (his publishers) during the trial brought against them by the Crown for the publication of Last Exit to Brooklyn by Hubert Selby. It was at the celebratory party afterwards that he first met Burroughs – initially mistaking him for a butler, as the latter was dressed in dark suit and tie.

He had four volumes of poetry published during his lifetime, beginning with Ash Flowers in 1958 (completed whilst still an undergraduate), and followed by Fugitive Visions (1962), The Death of Mayakovsky (1968) and Kaleidoscope (1973). His manuscript of Kaleidoscope is at Indiana University, where he was a Visiting Professor from 1978 to 1979.

Andrews lived his final years as a recluse in Nottingham, and died there on February 13, 2009. He left a major work, "Hometown (The Denver Poem)", 57 parts long, which has not yet been published. He worked on this for the last twenty years of his life.

Awards
 Fulbright Fellowship
 James Phelan Fellowship
 Woodrow Wilson Fellowship

Bibliography
 Lyman Andrews, Ash Flowers: First Poems (Baltimore, MD: Contemporary Poetry, 1958).
 Lyman Andrews, Fugitive Visions (Oakland, CA: White Rabbit, 1962).
 Lyman Andrews, "The Death of Mayakovsky", in New Writers, vol. 8 (London: Calder and Boyars, 1968). 
 Lyman Andrews, F. W. Willetts and Christine Bowler, Red Dust 1: new writing, (New York, NY: Red Dust, 1970). 
 Lyman Andrews, Kaleidoscope (London: Calder and Boyars, 1973).

References

External links
Open Library entry for Kaleidoscope (Signature)

1938 births
2009 deaths
Poets from Colorado
Writers from Denver
Academics of the University of Leicester
American expatriates in England
Alumni of King's College London